Adam Ejler Hansen (born 13 January 2004) is a professional footballer who plays for Danish side HB Køge. Born in Denmark, he represents the Greenland national team.

Club career
Ejler came up through the academy of Holbæk B&I. He had been with the club since at least 2015 while playing for the under-12 side. On 3 September 2020 he made his senior team debut in a 2–1 2020–21 Danish Cup victory over Suså IF. At 16 years 7 months and 21 days old, he became the youngest player ever to represent the first team in official competition. He was later recognized as a member of the Holbæk Academy Hall of Fame.

In 2021 Ejler moved to the academy of HB Køge of the Danish 1st Division. He made his senior debut for the club as a second-half substitute on 15 October 2022 in a 3–0 victory over Fremad Amager.

International career
Ejler is of Greenlandic descent through his grandparents, but grew up in Denmark. In August 2021, Greenland head coach Morten Rutkjær named Ejler to the 24-man squad that would train and compete against several Danish clubs in Denmark the following month. Ejler was one of two Denmark-based players in the squad, along with Nemo Thomsen. He made his debut for the team in the opening match of the camp, an eventual 1–1 draw with Vildbjerg SF on 8 September 2021. The camp was the first of its kind after the Greenland Football Association began the process of joining CONCACAF. Eljer played regularly during the camp's matches and was named Man of the Match in a 1–4 defeat to FC Nordsjælland at the Right to Dream Park in the final friendly.

He was then part of the roster for Greenland's first match against an official national team after beginning the process of joining CONCACAF, a friendly match against Kosovo under-21 to be played in Turkey in September 2022.

References

External links
Soccerway profile

2004 births
Living people
Greenlandic footballers
Danish men's footballers
Danish people of Greenlandic descent
Holbæk B&I players
Association football defenders